Legacy Releasing was an independent film distribution company based in California. It was founded in 1996 by Mark Borde and J. David Williams, veterans in the motion picture industry.

The company's first two releases, Once Upon a Time...When We Were Colored and Robert Wuhl's Open Season, were shown at the Cannes Film Festival the same year it was established. Afterwards, it became a leader in independent distribution, releasing an average of 15 films per year.

Notable films from the company included Little Men, Wedding Bell Blues, The Swan Princess: Escape from Castle Mountain, Shiloh (and its sequel, Shiloh Season), and an animated version of Pippi Longstocking.

None of Legacy's output was successful financially. Its highest-grossing film, When We Were Colored, took close to $2.3 million at the U.S. box office. However, the home video business was booming at the time and was the economic engine of this company.

In 1999, Legacy went out of business, and was successfully merged and consolidated into Warner Home Video. Borde went on to become co-president of another company, the short-lived Independent Artists. As of 2006, Legacy's official site (legacyfilms.com) no longer exists.

Borde is now the head of Freestyle Releasing. Williams is now the CEO of Marble Arch Entertainment.

Filmography

References

External links
Official website (Archive)
PDF biography of Borde, the company's founder

Defunct mass media companies of the United States
Film distributors of the United States
Companies based in Los Angeles County, California
Mass media companies established in 1996
Mass media companies disestablished in 1999
Defunct companies based in California